Agathocles is a Greek name. The most famous person called Agathocles was Agathocles of Syracuse, the tyrant of Syracuse.

Other people named Agathocles include:
Agathocles, a sophist, teacher of Damon
Agathocles (writers), was the name of a number of ancient writers, including an ancient historian referred to by Pliny and Cicero
Agathocles of Pella, father of Lysimachus
Agathocles, one of the sons of Agathocles of Syracuse from his first marriage
Agathocles (son of Lysimachus), the son and heir of Lysimachus
Agathocles, grandson of Agathocles of Syracuse with his third wife Theoxena of Syracuse
Agathocles of Egypt, son of the above named Agathocles; guardian of Ptolemy V Epiphanes and brother of Agathoclea, mistress of Ptolemy IV Philopator
Agathocles of Bactria, an Indo-Greek king who ruled about 185 BC
Agathocles of Samos, a Greek writer. He wrote at least one book, which was called Commonwealth of Pessinus and mentioned by Pseudo-Plutarch

See also
Agathocle, a play by Voltaire 
Agafokliya, a related Russian feminine first name

Greek masculine given names